Death Takes a Holiday is a 1934 American pre-Code romantic drama starring Fredric March, Evelyn Venable and Guy Standing. It is based on the 1924 Italian play La morte in vacanza by Alberto Casella (1891–1957), as adapted in English for Broadway in 1929 by Walter Ferris.

Synopsis
After years of questioning why people fear him, Death takes on human form as Prince Sirki (Fredric March) for three days so that he can mingle among mortals and find an answer. He finds a host in Duke Lambert (Guy Standing) after revealing himself and his intentions to the Duke, and he takes up temporary residence in the Duke's villa. However, Death falls in love with the beautiful young Grazia (Evelyn Venable). As he does so, Duke Lambert, the father of Grazia's mortal lover Corrado (Kent Taylor), begs him to give Grazia up and leave her among the living.

Death is torn between seeking his own happiness or sacrificing it so that Grazia may live. After listening to the pleas from the Duke and his houseguests, Death finally decides to let Grazia live and returns to his true self, a black shadow. As he prepares to depart, Grazia chooses to go with him, telling him that she knew all along who he really was. Death then proclaims that love is greater than illusion and is as strong as death. He puts his arm around Grazia, and they both disappear in a flash of light.

Cast

Releases
The theatrical premiere of the film was on February 23, 1934, at the Paramount Theatre in New York City. The home video releases have been:
 
  (as part of the Meet Joe Black Ultimate Edition)

Reception
Time called the film "thoughtful and delicately morbid", while Mordaunt Hall for The New York Times wrote that "it is an impressive picture, each scene of which calls for close attention".

Richard Watts, Jr, for the New York Herald Tribune, described it as "An interesting, frequently striking and occasionally beautiful dramatic fantasy", while the Chicago Daily Tribune said that March was "completely submerged in probably the greatest role he has ever played." Variety called it "the kind of story and picture that beckons the thinker, and for this reason is likely to have greater appeal among the intelligensia." It praised March's performance as "skillful". John Mosher of The New Yorker wrote that the film was "nicely done", although he suggested it was "a little obnoxious with all its talk of being in love with death."

The New York Times initially listed the film among those that "failed completely" at the box office. Yet one month later the same author in the Times described the movie as a "gratifying success" for Paramount that "gave new life to the stockholders". 

The American Film Institute recognized the film with a nomination in its 2002 list, AFI's 100 Years...100 Passions.

Remakes and adaptations
A one-hour radio adaptation of the film aired on Cecil B. DeMille's Lux Radio Theatre on March 22, 1937, starring Fredric March reprising his role as Death and his wife, actress Florence Eldridge, as Grazia.
Universal Studios, which acquired the rights to the film in 1962 following a merger with then-owners MCA, made a 1971 television production featuring Yvette Mimieux, Monte Markham, Myrna Loy, Melvyn Douglas and Bert Convy. Loy related in her biography that the production was marred by a decline in filming production standards; she described a frustrated Douglas storming off the set and returning to his home in New York when a tour guide interrupted the filming of one of his dramatic scenes to point out Rock Hudson's dressing room.
The film was remade by Universal again in 1998 as Meet Joe Black starring Brad Pitt, Claire Forlani and Anthony Hopkins.
It was adapted into a musical by Maury Yeston with the book by Peter Stone and Thomas Meehan. It began previews Off-Broadway on June 10, and officially opened on July 21, 2011, in a limited engagement through September 4, 2011, at the Laura Pels Theatre at the Harold & Miriam Steinberg Center for Theatre in a production by Roundabout Theatre Company.
A May 2006 episode of the television drama Medium also builds on the concept of death portrayed as a man. The season 2 episode is similarly titled, being called "Death Takes a Policy".

References

Further reading
 Loy, Myrna and Kotsilibis-Davies, James. Being and Becoming, Alfred A. Knopf, Inc. 1987; .
 Quirk, Lawrence J. The Films of Fredric March, The Citadel Press, 1971; .

External links
 
 
 
 
 Death Takes a Holiday on Lux Radio Theater: March 22, 1937

1934 romantic drama films
1930s romantic fantasy films
American black-and-white films
American romantic drama films
American romantic fantasy films
American films based on plays
Films directed by Mitchell Leisen
Paramount Pictures films
Films about personifications of death
Films scored by Bernhard Kaun
Films scored by John Leipold
Films about princes